Wilhelm Koenen (7 April 1886 – 19 October 1963) was a German communist activist and an East German politician. He was married to Emmy Damerius-Koenen and was the father of Heinrich Koenen and Johanna Koenen.

Biographical details 
Koenen was born in Hamburg, the son of a socialist carpenter and a cook. After finishing Volksschule, he continued his education, taking classes in business from 1900 to 1903. Koenen joined the Social Democratic Party of Germany (SPD) in 1903. In 1904, he found employment at a book shop in Kiel. In addition, he took courses at the workers' school in Hamburg and the Social Democrat Party school in Berlin. In 1907, he became a newspaper correspondent in Kiel and then in Königsberg. In 1911, he became editor of the social democrat newspaper, Volksblatt, in Halle.

In 1913, he became a member of the local district SPD leadership and with the majority of the local membership, joined the Independent Social Democratic Party (USPD) in 1917. During the German Revolution of 1918–1919, Koenen was the commissar of the Worker and Soldiers' Council of the Halle-Merseburg district. In the 1919–1920 German federal election, he was elected to the Weimar National Assembly. On 16 July 1919, in the National Assembly, he called for the adoption of a constitutional provision that would exclusively grant to the authorities and charitable organizations the right to hold public film screenings for adolescents so that youth would be protected from the wheeling and dealing of "the capitalists".

In 1919, Koenen was a member of the board of the USPD's central committee, but in 1920, he joined the Communist Party (Kommunistische Partei Deutschlands, or KPD), where he became part of the left wing. Between the 1920 and 1932, he was a representative in the Weimar Republic Reichstag and, in addition, from 1926 to 1932, a city councilor in Berlin. In 1932, he became a representative in the Preußischer Landtag.

From 1924, he was a member of the "Middle Group" (Mittelgruppe) and in 1925, actively supported the leadership group headed by Ernst Thälmann. Koenen was the political secretary of the KPD for the district of Halle-Merseburg from 1929 to 1931, when internal politics forced him into the background and he lost his party function in Halle and what had been his secure place on the party list. Koenen was one of some 40 people at the meeting of the KPD central committee on 7 February 1933, at the Sporthaus Ziegenhals, just a week after the Nazi Party seized power and was the last time that Thälmann, chairman of the KPD, spoke to the central committee.

Koenen left Germany in June 1933 on the decision of the party leadership, first going to the Saarland, then still under foreign occupation. He then went to France, where he was involved in the "Lutetia circle", trying to build a popular front against the Hitler régime. From 1935 to 1938, he lived in Czechoslovakia, where he was married to Emmy Damerius. They moved to England, where they were both taken into custody as an "enemy aliens" in 1940. She was sent to the Isle of Man until 1941; he was shipped to an internment camp in Canada until 1942. In 1943, he was a founding member of the "Free Germany" movement in London. In 1944, he worked at the British black propaganda radio station, Soldatensender Calais.

In 1945, he returned to Germany and took part in rebuilding the KPD. After the forced merger of the SPD and the KPD into the Socialist Unity Party of Germany (Sozialistische Einheitspartei Deutschlands, or SED), he took part in building the SED in East Germany. Until 1946, he also worked as the chief editor of the KPD newspaper, Freiheit in Halle, forerunner of the Mitteldeutsche Zeitung. In 1946, he became part of the board of the SED, as well as its central committee. Between 1946 and 1949, Koenen was a representative in the Saxon Landtag. From 1949 until his death, he was a member of the Volkskammer and was leader of the Secretariat. In May 1953, he was accused of "a lack of vigilance" and was reprimanded by the SED leadership. In 1955, he became the chairman of the Interparlamentarischen Gruppe (Interparliamentarian Group) German Democratic Republic. In 1956, Wilhelm Koenen was decorated with the Karl Marx Order.

Personal 
Koenen's son Heinrich was arrested by the Gestapo at the home of Ilse Stöbe on 29 October 1942, and in February 1945 was shot at Sachsenhausen concentration camp.

His brother, Bernard Koenen was arrested briefly during the Great Purge. He and his brother are both buried at the Socialists' Memorial at the Berlin cemetery, Zentralfriedhof Friedrichsfelde. A street in Sangerhausen is named after Wilhelm Koenen.

Sources 
 Horst Neumann: Wilhelm Koenen, Bibliographisches Institut: Leipzig 1971 
 Asja Braune: Konsequent den unbequemen Weg gegangen. Adele Schreiber (1872–1957) Politikerin, Frauenrechtlerin, Journalistin 2002 in 2 Bänden = Diss. HU Berlin 2003.- Kap. 7 online: Das Exil mit Ausführungen zur Freien Deutschen Bewegung (FDB) und über die Freie Deutsche Hochschule in Großbritannien

References

External links 
 
Brief biography (PDF) Rosa-Luxemburg-Stiftung (2005) 

1886 births
1963 deaths
Politicians from Hamburg
Social Democratic Party of Germany politicians
Independent Social Democratic Party politicians
Communist Party of Germany politicians
Members of the Politburo of the Central Committee of the Socialist Unity Party of Germany
Members of the Weimar National Assembly
Members of the Reichstag of the Weimar Republic
Members of the Provisional Volkskammer
Members of the 1st Volkskammer
Members of the 2nd Volkskammer
Members of the 3rd Volkskammer
Members of the Landtag of Saxony
German male writers
German male journalists
Exiles from Nazi Germany
Recipients of the Patriotic Order of Merit in silver
Recipients of the Banner of Labor
20th-century German journalists